Uranothauma belcastroi the Belcastro's branded blue, is a butterfly in the family Lycaenidae. It is found in Guinea, Sierra Leone and Ivory Coast. The habitat consists of upland forests.

Adult males mud-puddle. Adults are on wing in October.

References

Butterflies described in 1997
Uranothauma